Terefundus anomalus is a species of sea snail, a marine gastropod mollusk in the family Muricidae, the murex snails or rock snails.

Description
The length of the shell reaches 3.6 mm.

Distribution
This marine species occurs off Ninety Mile Beach, North Island, New Zealand

References

 Dell, R. K. (1956). The archibenthal Mollusca of New Zealand. Dominion Museum Bulletin. 18: 1-235
 Spencer, H.G., Marshall, B.A. & Willan, R.C. (2009). Checklist of New Zealand living Mollusca. pp  196–219. in: Gordon, D.P. (ed.) New Zealand inventory of biodiversity. Volume one. Kingdom Animalia: Radiata, Lophotrochozoa, Deuterostomia. Canterbury University Press, Christchurch.

External links
 Gastropods.com: Terefundus anomalus

Gastropods described in 1956
Gastropods of New Zealand
Pagodulinae